Jeanne Angèle Desirée Yvonne Joulain (22 July 1920 – 1 February 2010) was a French organist, concertist and music educator.

Biography 
Born in Amiens, Joulain's first contact with music was made thanks to her musician parents. Her father, a teacher in Paris, played the violin and her mother was a piano teacher. So it's only natural that she should start playing the piano with her mother. In 1934, after a decisive meeting with the great pianist Raoul Koczalski, Jeanne Joulain entered the conservatory of Amiens. During her studies, she followed the classes of solfeggio, piano (class of Maurice Coze), cello (class of Mario Camerini, pupil of Paul Bazelaire), chamber music, orchestra, harmony, counterpoint, musical composition (classes of Pierre Camus, the director, himself a pupil of composition of Charles-Marie Widor, and organ when the class was created in 1936 (class of Colette Ponchel, one of the last pupils of Louis Vierne) where she won the first prizes. It was during this period that her pedagogical activity began, as she had to make several replacements for teachers of music theory, piano, cello, harmony and organ.
 
In 1938, the grand organ of Amiens Cathedral was restored. After the inauguration concert given by Marcel Dupré, a small orchestra was formed to accompany Salvation. Jeanne Joulain was a member of this orchestra as a cellist and it was on this occasion that she was introduced to Marcel Dupré by Pierre Camus, the director of the conservatory.

In 1943, after her first training at the Conservatoire d'Amiens, her desire to go further prompted her to enrol at the École César Franck, where she perfected in the same disciplines and obtained diplomas of piano (class of Jean Batalla), cello (class of Edwige Bergeron-Brachet), organ (class of Édouard Souberbielle and Abel Decaux) after two years. In addition, she won the diploma of musical composition (class of Guy de Lioncourt) after five years.

In 1945, Jeanne Joulain decided to write to Marcel Dupré with the intention of taking private lessons. The latter, after having assessed her level, offered to prepare her to enter the conservatory. For two years, she attended the "petit cours" in Meudon and in 1947 she passed the entrance exam for the Conservatoire de Paris. where she obtained the First prize of organ and musical improvisation in 1952 (class of Marcel Dupré).

In 1950, she won the competitions to be able to teach and began teaching in February 1951 at the Conservatoire de Lille. In October 1952 at that of Roubaix, which she left for the conservatory of Douai from 1960 to 1970. Her teaching activities ceased in 1982.

In the long list of people who have attended her courses were 
Michel Alabau (organist in charge of the Saint-Séverin church in Paris), René Courdent (organist in charge of churches  and Notre-Dame des Anges of Tourcoing), Patrick Delabre (titular organist of the Cathedral Notre-Dame de Chartres), Yves Devernay (titular organist of Notre-Dame de Paris), Jérôme Faucheur (titular organist of the churches of Bondues and Wambrechies and organ teacher in Comines and Hazebrouck), Marie-Agnès Grall-Menet (titular organist of the grand organ of Saint-Nicolas-du-Chardonnet church in Paris), Philippe Lefèbvre (titular organist of Notre-Dame de Paris), Jean-Philippe Mesnier (successor of Jeanne Joulain as organ teacher at the Douai Conservatory (1970-2000), titular organist of the Saint-Pierre de Douai collegiate church), Marguerite Spillaert (honorary organist of the Saint-Pierre-Saint-Paul church in Lille) etc.

She was titular organist of the Sainte Jeanne d'Arc church in Amiens, of the Mutin-Cavaillé-Coll of the Collégiate church Saint-Pierre of Douai and finally of the Delmotte of the Saint-Maurice church in Lille.

She has given numerous recitals in France (including in Chartres Cathedral, Saint-Sulpice, Notre-Dame de Paris, Bordeaux, Béziers, Toulon, Belley, and abroad (Altenberg, Mons, Brussels, Tournai, St Brice and Tournai Cathedral, St. Patrick's Cathedral in New-York city, and St Paul's Cathedral in London.

In addition to her teaching and concert work, she was a correspondent for the Musique-Sacrée magazine L'Organiste. She also participated in numerous juries of competitions for organ classes.

Jeanne Joulain died in Lille on 1 February 2010 at the age of 89. Many fellow organists were present at her funeral in Lille, during which the organ was played by Jean Guillou.

Works 
Jeanne Joulain is the author of pieces for solo organ, voice and piano, voice and orchestra and various instrumental ensembles.

In addition, she has made several reconstructions of improvisations on the organ by Pierre Cochereau.

1936–1943: 9 mélodies pour chant et piano: Mon âme a son secret (Félix Arvers), Soir d'été (Albert Samain), Le jardin mouillé (Henri de Régnier), La mer (Henri de Régnier), La lune blanche (Paul Verlaine), La légende des Perce-neige (Jeanne Paruit), Vierge sainte (Abbé Perreyve), Promenade sur l'eau (André Theuriet) and Le page d'automne (Janette de Neaux); unpublished
 O, la splendeur de notre joie: mélodie for voice and piano (Émile Verhaeren); unpublished
1937: Les peupliers: mélodie for voice and piano (Rosemonde Gérard); unpublished
1938: Cantabile: piece for organ; unpublished
1938-1943 La source: mélodie for voice and piano or orchestra (anonymous); unpublished
1939: Thème et variation (on the name of Pierre Camus): piece for organ; unpublished
1940-1943 Chanson bengalie: mélodie for voice and piano or orchestra (Rabindranath Tagore); unpublished
1941: Variation sur un thème breton: piece for organ; unpublished
1941: Prélude: piece for organ; unpublished
1942: Communion: piece for organ; unpublished
1942: O vent fou!: mélodie for voice and piano (Rabindranath Tagore); unpublished
1942: Domine non sum dignus: motet with 4 mixed voices, unpublished
1942: Factus es repente: motet with 4 mixed voices; unpublished
1943–1944 Lamento: piece for organ or orchestra; unpublished
1944: Berceuse: mélodie for voice and piano (Maurice de Noisay); unpublished
1942-1945: Cantantibus organis: motet with 3 mixed voices, organ and accompaniment for strings; unpublished
1943-1945 Ave verum corpus: motet with 3 mixed voices and accompaniment for strings; unpublished
1943: Sarabande et gigue: piece for piano; unpublished
1943: Trois heures chez Lafleur: Patoisante musical fantasy for soloists, choir and orchestra (lyrics by Camille Dupetit); unpublished
1944: Le chant du coq: musical comedy in 1 act for soloist and orchestra (lyrics by André Schneider); unpublished
1944: Le rêve d'une mère: choreographic poem for chamber orchestra (lyrics by Jean Dubillet); unpublished
1945: Air de Ruth: excerpt from the 2nd song of "Booz" for soprano and piano (lyrics by André Schneider); unpublished
1946: Booz: biblical cantata in 5 songs for 4 soloists, choir and orchestra (lyrics by André Schneider); unpublished
1945: Antigone: orchestral suite, stage music for a performance of Antigone by Jean Anouilh: Prologue, Le crime d'Antigone, La justice des hommes, La colère de Créon, La plainte des vieillards thébains, La justice des dieux; unpublished
1946: Booz: biblical cantata in 5 songs for 4 soloists, choir and orchestra (lyrics by André Schneider); unpublished
1947: Symphonie concertante for organ and orchestra in 3 mouvements; unpublished
1951: Trois préludes: for piano in G major, B flat major and D minor, unpublished
1953: Variation sur "Jesu dulcis memoria": piece for organ;  "L'organiste", magazine Musique Sacrée
1954-1956: Trois pièces pour une Messe en l'honneur de la Sainte Vierge: Entrée - Offertoire - Communion: pieces for organ; "L'organiste", magazine Musique Sacrée
1958: Communion pour une Messe en l'honneur de la Sainte Vierge: piece for organ; "L'organiste", magazine Musique Sacrée
1958: Noël Flamand: piece for organ 1) series Orgue et Liturgie issue 40 2) Édition Chantraine, Tournai in 1994
1959: Final on "Ave Maris Stella" pour une Messe en l'honneur de la Sainte Vierge: piece for organ; "L'organiste", magazine Musique Sacrée
1959: Prélude à l'Introït pour la fête des Rameaux Hosanna Filio David; series Orgue et Liturgie issue 47
1961: Paraphrase pour la fête de la Toussaint "Justorum animae in manu Dei sunt": piece for organ; series Orgue et Liturgie issue 52
1962: In memoriam Louis Vierne: piece for organ; 1)L'organiste, magazine Musique Sacrée 2) Édition Chantraine, Tournai en 1995
1963: Communion pour tous les temps "Adoro Te": piece for organ; series Orgue et Liturgie issue 62
1972: Introduction and Dance (for the inauguration of an 18th century Tannenberg piano found in Lititz, Pennsylvania.): for piano, unpublished
1988: Canzona a 12 by Giovanni Gabrieli: adaptation for 2 organs; unpublished
1988: Canzona noni toni by Giovanni Gabrieli (Sacrae symphoniae Venice 1597): adaptation for 2 organs; unpublished
1988: Trois versets de Vêpres (4th - 6th - 7th) improvised by Pierre Cochereau: reconstitution for organ; Éditions Chantraine, Tournai in 1997
1988: Fugue du "Triptyque symphonique" improvised by Pierre Cochereau after the disc FY 059/60 recorded in Notre-Dame de Paris in 1977: reconstitution for organ; unpublished
1988: Pièce d'orgue; unpublished, (1st part) of the Prelude and Fugue on Antoine Drizenko's name)
1988: Treize improvisations sur les versets de Vêpres by Pierre Cochereau: reconstitution for organ, Éditions Chantraine, Tournai in 1997; Éditions Butz, St Augustin in 2008
 1988–1991 Prélude et fugue (on the name of Antoine Drizenko): piece for orgue, Édition Chantraine, Tournai in 1997 
 Elevation on "Victimae Pascali" : piece for organ; series "Orgue et Liturgie" issue 57 
 Postlude (on the name of Allan Remsen): piece for organ; series Orgue et Liturgie, issue 70
1990: Neuf pièces improvisées en forme de Suite française de Pierre Cochereau: reconstitution d'après le disque FY 059 enregistré aux grandes orgues de Notre Dame de Paris in March–June 1977, Édition Chantraine, Tournai in 1994
1991: Patchwork: piece for 2 organs; unpublished
1992: Cortège: piece for trumpet and organ; unpublished
1993: La Lucchesina (1601) by G. Guami (1540-1611): adaptation for 2 organs, unpublished
1993: Prélude en la mineur: for piano; unpublished
1995: Boite à musique: piece for piano, unpublished
1996: Messe en Mi "à la mémoire de Maurice Duruflé": for countertenor and organ; unpublished
1997: Trio: for piano, horn and flute; unpublished

Awards 
1952 - First prize of organ of the conservatoire de Paris.

Bibliography 
Entretien avec Jeanne Joulain; Norbert Dufourcq; L’Orgue, issue 206 (1988/II)
Pour l’amour de la Musique. Jeanne Joulain. Repères biographiques Étienne Delahaye; L'Orgue, issue 290 (2010/II)

References

External links 
 Jeanne Joulain's obituary on La Voix du Nord (4 February 2010)
 Jeanne Joulain on Symétrie
 Jeanne Joulain on Éditions Chantraine
 Jeanne Joulain on France Orgue

1920 births
2010 deaths
People from Amiens
Conservatoire de Paris alumni
French classical organists
Women organists
French music educators
Women music educators
20th-century classical musicians